Phytoecia vittipennis is a species of beetle in the family Cerambycidae. It was described by Reiche in 1877. It is known from Armenia, Syria, Bulgaria, Greece, and Turkey. It feeds on Achillea arabica.

Subspecies
 Phytoecia vittipennis prawei Plavilstshikov, 1926
 Phytoecia vittipennis leuthneri Ganglbauer, 1886
 Phytoecia vittipennis vittipennis Reiche, 1877

References

Phytoecia
Beetles described in 1877